The following tables show results for the Australian House of Representatives at the 2001 federal election held on 10 November 2001. The parliament increased from 148 to 150 seats, with a new seat in Western Australia and a new seat in the Northern Territory.

Australia

Independents: Peter Andren, Tony Windsor, Bob Katter

States

New South Wales

Victoria

Queensland

Western Australia

South Australia

Tasmania

Territories

Australian Capital Territory

Northern Territory

References 

House of Representatives 2001
Australian House of Representatives